Coroneo is a Mexican city and municipality located in the state of Guanajuato. The municipality has an area of 122.90 square kilometres (0.40% of the surface of the state) and is bordered to the north and the east by the state of Querétaro, to the south by the state of Michoacán, and to the west by Jerécuaro.  The municipality had 10,347 inhabitants according to the 2005 census.

In pre-Columbian times the area was an important center of Chupícuaro culture, one of the oldest in Mesoamerica, who knew the region as "Place of abundant grain, medicinal plants and creepers."

Its current name is of Otomi origin and means ""Place between two hills."

The municipal president of Coroneo and its many smaller outlying communities is Carlos López Ruiz.

References

Coroneo, Guanajuato
Municipalities of Guanajuato